Patrick Fahey (25 August 1923 – 26 February 2008) was an Irish long-distance runner. He competed in the men's 10,000 metres at the 1948 Summer Olympics.

References

1923 births
2008 deaths
Athletes (track and field) at the 1948 Summer Olympics
Irish male long-distance runners
Olympic athletes of Ireland
Place of birth missing